Nikonov is a Russian surname.

Nikonov may also refer to:
 Nikonov machine gun
 2386 Nikonov
 Nikonov, Astrakhan Oblast